The Erniettomorphs are a form of Ediacaran fossil consisting of rows of airbed-like tubes arranged along a midline with a glide symmetry. Representative genera include Ernietta, Phyllozoon, Pteridinium, Swartpuntia. Undisputed Erniettomorphs were Ediacaran, but the species Erytholus, Rutgersella, and Protonympha, who have by some been included in this group but are by no means clear members, are found through to the Late Devonian . Their affinity is uncertain; they probably form a clade and are most likely a sister group to the rangeomorphs, which bear a similar (though fractal) construction. Placements within the metazoan crown-group have been rebutted, and it is most likely that these peculiar organisms lie in the stem group to the animals. There is no evidence that they possessed a mouth or gut. Because they may have been found in water which was too deep to permit photosynthesis – and in some cases, lived half-buried in sediment, it is speculated that they fed by osmosis from the sea water. Such a lifestyle requires a very high surface area to volume ratio – higher than is observed in fossils. However, this paradox can be resolved if much of the volume of the organisms was not metabolically active. Many Pteridinium fossils are found completely filled with sand; if this sand were present within the organism while it was alive, this would reduce its metabolically active volume enough to make osmotic feeding viable.

See also
Rangeomorpha, a probable sister clade
Proarticulata, sharing similar 'glide symmetry'
Ediacara biota, for an overview of the bizarre late Ediacaran organisms
List of Ediacaran genera

References

Ediacaran life
Petalonamae